Cymindis obscura is a species of ground beetle in the subfamily Harpalinae. It was described by Casey in 1920.

References

obscura
Beetles described in 1920